Edward Hale may refer to:
 Edward Hale (politician) (1800–1875), Canadian businessman and politician
 Edward Danforth Hale (1859–1945), music conservatory pedagogue, Dean of Music at the University of Colorado
 Edward Everett Hale (1822–1909), American author and clergyman
 Edward J. Hale (1839–1922), American soldier and diplomat 
 Edward Hale (artist) (1852–1924), British artist
 Edward Hale (cricketer) (1764–1823), cricketer 
 Edward Hale (rower) (born 1947), Australian rower
 Edward Hale (seigneur) (died 1862), member of the Special Council of Lower Canada